The Cugnet river (in French: rivière Cugnet) is a tributary of the Beaurivage River which is a tributary of the west bank of the Chaudière River (slope of the south bank of the St. Lawrence River). It flows in the municipality of Saint-Lambert-de-Lauzon of the Lotbinière Regional County Municipality and in the Saint-Étienne-de-Lauzon of the city of Lévis, in the administrative region of Chaudière-Appalaches, in Quebec, in Canada.

Geography 

The main neighboring watersheds of the Cugnet river are:
 north side: Beaurivage River, Chaudière River;
 east side: Chaudière River;
 south side: Malbrook stream, Bras d'Henri, Beaurivage River;
 West side: rivière aux Pins, Noire River, rivière Rouge, Beaurivage River.

The Cugnet river takes its source south of "rue du Pont", in the Saint-Lambert-de-Lauzon area of the city of Lévis.

From its source, the Cugnet River flows in agricultural and forest areas over  divided into the following segments:
  towards the west, up to the road separating the sectors of Saint-Lambert-de-Lauzon (south side) and Saint-Étienne-de-Lauzon (North Coast);
  westward, up to its confluence.

The Cugnet river empties on the eastern bank of the Beaurivage River in the hamlet "Pointe Saint-Gilles". This confluence is located at:
  downstream of the bridge separating the Lotbinière Regional County Municipality and the town of Lévis (Saint-Étienne-de-Lauzon sector);
 downstream from the village of Saint-Gilles;
 upstream of the hamlet "chemin Craig".

Toponymy 
The term "Cugnet" constitutes a family name of French origin.

The toponym "Cugnet river" evokes the life work of François-Joseph Cugnet, Lord of Saint-Étienne. Cugnet has also worked as judge, attorney general, grand voyer, official translator and French secretary to the governor and the Council of Quebec, clerk of the terrier and lawyer. He was born on June 26, 1720, in Quebec. He is the eldest son of François-Étienne Cugnet and Louise-Madeleine Dusautoy (Dusaultoir). He died in this town on November 16, 1789.

The toponym "rivière Cugnet" was made official on December 5, 1968, at the Commission de toponymie du Québec.

See also 

 List of rivers of Quebec

References 

Rivers of Chaudière-Appalaches
Lotbinière Regional County Municipality
Lévis, Quebec